CentraCare is an integrated health care system in Central Minnesota. The nonprofit includes six hospitals, seven senior care facilities, 18 clinics, four pharmacies and numerous inpatient and outpatient specialty care services.

Major entities

St. Cloud Hospital

Founded in 1886 by the Sisters of the Order of St. Benedict, St. Cloud Hospital is a Catholic, not-for-profit hospital located in St. Cloud, Minnesota. It offers inpatient and outpatient services, including care for heart disease and cancer, preventive health screenings and behavioral health services.

The teaching hospital employs more than 4,900 staff, 450 physicians and 1,000 volunteers. It serves 690,000 people in the surrounding 12-county area and ranks among the 100 TOP Hospitals nationwide according to Truven Health Analytics, a national healthcare rating agency.

CentraCare — Long Prairie
 Long Prairie Clinic, family medicine
 Long Prairie Hospital, 25 beds
 Long Prairie Care Center, 70 beds, long-term care

CentraCare  — Long Prairie serves Todd County, Minnesota and employs more than 250 staff (2014). The Minnesota Department of Health certified CentraCare Clinic — Long Prairie as a designated health care home site through November 2015 and accredited Long Prairie Hospital as an Acute Stroke Ready Hospital. CentraCare — Long Prairie's long-term care facility was also among the 10 percent of Minnesota care centers awarded five stars on the Centers for Medicare and Medicaid Services (CMS) Nursing Home Compare rating system.

CentraCare — Melrose
 Melrose Clinic, family medicine
 Melrose Hospital, 25-bed critical access hospital with retail pharmacy
 Pine Villa Care Center, 75-bed long-term care facility with Alzheimer's unit
 Park View Center, 61-unit senior apartment building with assisted living services
 CentraCare Radiation Oncology (Alexandria)

This network serves 10,000 residents in and around western Stearns County, Minnesota and employs more than 280 staff. The Diabetes Self-Management Education (DSME) program at CentraCare — Melrose is certified by the American Diabetes Association, and Melrose Clinic is a health care home-certified site through November 2015, per Minnesota Department of Health guidelines.

CentraCare — Monticello 
 Monticello Hospital, 25-bed hospital with Acute Inpatient Rehabilitation and Level IV Trauma Center
 Monticello Care Center, 89-bed long-term care facility
 Monticello Medical Group
 Monticello Cancer Center

CentraCare  — Sauk Centre 
 Sauk Centre Clinic, family medicine
 Sauk Centre Hospital, 25-bed critical access hospital
 Sauk Centre Care Center, 60-bed long-term care facility
 Lakeshore Estates, 30-unit independent living senior housing

CentraCare — Sauk Centre serves 10,000 residents in and around western Stearns County, Minnesota and employs more than 230 staff.

CentraCare — Paynesville 
 Family medicine clinics in Cold Spring, Eden Valley, P
 Paynesville and Richmond
 Paynesville Hospital
 Koronis Manor Care Center, long-term care facility
 Stearns Place, retirement apartments
 Washburne Court, assisted living apartments

CentraCare Clinic
CentraCare Clinic operates more than 30 clinics and several specialty clinics in Central Minnesota and employs about 1,000 staff. CentraCare Clinic includes more than 260 providers who practice 25 medical specialties and offer outreach services in 40 communities. CentraCare eClinic provides an online diagnosis option. Clinic sites include:
   
 Albany Clinic
 Becker Clinic
 Big Lake Clinic

 Cold Spring Clinic

 Eden Valley Clinic
 Family Health Center, St. Cloud
 Health Plaza Endocrinology, St. Cloud
 Health Plaza Family Medicine, St. Cloud
 Health Plaza Internal Medicine, St. Cloud
 Health Plaza Obstetrics & Women's Health, St. Cloud
 Health Plaza Pediatrics, St. Cloud
 Health Plaza Pediatrics Walk-In Care, St. Cloud
 Little Falls Specialty Clinic
 Long Prairie Clinic
 Melrose Clinic
 Monticello Medical Group
 Northway Family Medicine, St. Cloud
 Paynesville Clinic
 Richmond Clinic
 River Campus, St. Cloud
 Sauk Centre Clinic
 St. Joseph Clinic
 Willmar Skylark Clinic

St. Benedict's Senior Community
St. Benedict's Senior Community provides nursing services, including short stay and hospice care, as well as services for those with Alzheimer’s disease or other memory-loss conditions. Senior housing offerings include retirement, assisted living and income-based apartments. St. Benedict's has locations in both St. Cloud and Monticello, Minnesota, and care center services include therapeutic recreation, nutrition, rehabilitation services, respite, hospice and spiritual care, social services and a beauty/barber salon.

CentraCare Foundation
CentraCare Foundation engages the philanthropic community in partnership to improve health and health care. The Foundation accepts charitable contributions for all CentraCare entities. In fiscal year 2014-2015, CentraCare Foundation gave more than $5 million in health care grants throughout Central Minnesota.

Carris Health
A subsidiary of CentraCare, Carris Health formed in 2018. In June 2022, Carris Health renamed to CentraCare.

Willmar's Rice Memorial Hospital 
In April 2021, CentraCare, which owns Willmar's Rice Memorial Hospital through its affiliate Carris Health, will bear the $32 million debt associated with the hospital from the city of Willmar.

References

1995 establishments in Minnesota
Non-profit organizations based in Minnesota
Health care companies based in Minnesota
Catholic health care
Catholic hospital networks in the United States